This is a listing of winners from the 2001 Genesis Awards.

Film
Feature Film: "Chicken Run" (DreamWorks Pictures)

Television
Network Newsmagazine: "Dateline NBC," for two powerful, sobering exposes—on puppy mills and on broadtail fur. 

Television Dramatic Series: "Family Law" (CBS), for a story featuring a custody battle for a chimpanzee, exploring the arguments against keeping primates as companion  animals.

Television Comedy Series: "Popular" (The WB), for a script questioning the eating of cows and the wearing of leather.

Television Talk Show: "Politically Incorrect" (ABC), for arguments against hunting and declaring that the animals' right to live supersedes a dying child's wish to kill.

Cable Documentary: "Investigative Reports" (A&E), for a look at the perils facing the buffalo of Yellowstone National Park.

Cable Newsmagazine: "CNN & TIME magazine" (CNN), for exposing greyhound racing.

Cable Documentary Series: "Earth Rescue" (Outdoor Life Network), for an overview of elephants in circuses, exposing the capture, transport, training methods and lifestyles they endure.

PBS Documentary: "Nature," for an unprecedented look at the history of elephants held captive for human curiosity and entertainment.

PBS Series: "ITN World News," for exposing some of the worst cases of animal torture around the world.

News Series: KING-TV (Seattle), for a seven-part series revealing the suffering of cows as they are turned into food.

News Feature: KARE-TV (Minneapolis), for revealing the cruelty to horses in the production of Premarin.

Reality Programming: "Wild Rescues" (Animal Planet), for a series of powerful segments spotlighting animals in peril, and those people whose valiant efforts save them.

Children's Programming: "Nick News With Linda Ellerbee." (Nickelodeon), for introducing information on myriad animal issues, presented in a format easily embraced by children.

Children's Programming - Animated: "The Wild Thornberrys" (Nickelodeon), for a sterling season of inspired and clever episodes nurturing a sense of compassion and responsibility.

Cartoonist: "Cathy," for challenging the fur industry's hype with style and wit, and for promoting the adoption of older dogs from shelters.

Print
Periodical: The Atlantic Monthly, for "From the Leash to the Laboratory," which unmasks the trade involving the theft of dogs for sale to laboratories.

Special awards
Ark Trust International Award: Daily Express (United Kingdom), for "Terrible Despair of Animals Cut Up in Name of Research," a two-part exposé on xenotransplantation.

Brigitte Bardot International Award: (ARTE), for a segment airing in France and Germany that shines the media spotlight on the abuse of U.S. rodeo animals.

Ark Trust International Award to Lucy Johnston and Jonathan Calvert of The Daily Express, United Kingdom, for "Terrible Despair of Animals Cut Up in the Name of Research."

References

2001 film awards
2001 television awards